Pointe de Paumont (in French) or Cima del Vallone (in Italian) is a mountain of Savoie, France and of the Province of Turin, Italy. It lies in the Cottian Alps range. It has an elevation of 3,171 metres above sea level.

Etymology
Paumort, the name used on French maps, should come from a toponym used on the Italian side of the mountain (croce di Paumont, rio di Paumont), which derives from Piedmontese "pàu mòrt" («fear of death»).

Geography 
In the French subdivision of Western Alps it belongs to the Massif du Mont-Cenis while in the SOIUSA (International Standardized Mountain Subdivision of the Alps) it' the highest mountain of a subgroups (STG) called Crête Grand Vallon-pointe du Fréjus ( Fr) or Cresta Gran Vallone-punta del Fréjus (It) - code:I/A-4.III-B.5.a.

Administratively the mountain is divided between the commune of Avrieux (F, north face) and the comune of Bardonecchia (I, south-western and south-eastern faces).

Access to the summit 

The easiest route for the summit starts from Pelouse's pass, which connects Avrieux and Bardonecchia, and follows the eastern ridge of the mountain passing by Cime Gardoria/Cima Gardiola (3,137 m). Other two routes, roughly of the same climbing grade, follow the other two ridges which meet on the mountain's summit: the southern one from Roccia Verde pass and the northwestern one from Punta Bagnà.

Notes

Maps
 Italian official cartography (Istituto Geografico Militare - IGM); on-line version: www.pcn.minambiente.it
 French  official cartography (Institut Géographique National - IGN); on-line version:  www.geoportail.fr
 Istituto Geografico Centrale - Carta dei sentieri e dei rifugi scala 1:50.000 n.1 Valli di Susa Chisone e Germanasca and 1:25.000 n.104 Bardonecchia Monte Thabor Sauze d'Oulx

External links 

Mountains of the Alps
Mountains of Savoie
Mountains of Piedmont
Alpine three-thousanders
France–Italy border
International mountains of Europe
Mountains partially in France
Mountains partially in Italy
Three-thousanders of France
Three-thousanders of Italy